XHPQUI-FM is a radio station on 102.7 FM in Tequisquiapan, Querétaro, Mexico. It is known as K Digital and broadcasts from a tower on Cerro La Trinidad.

History
XHPQUI was awarded in the IFT-4 radio auction of 2017 and came to air in June 2018.

References

2018 establishments in Mexico
Radio stations established in 2018
Radio stations in Querétaro
Radio stations in Mexico
Spanish-language radio stations